John Allan Epping (born March 20, 1983) is a Canadian curler from Toronto, Ontario. He currently skips his own team out of the Leaside Curling Club in East York, Toronto.

Career
Born in Peterborough, Ontario, Epping was a top junior curler, having won the Ontario Junior championship in 2004. At the 2004 Canadian Junior Curling Championships, his team finished with an 8-4 record, just out of the playoffs.  He won the 2006 Canadian Mixed Curling Championship with Julie Reddick, Scott Foster and Leigh Armstrong. He won the 2007 provincial mixed as well, but could not defend his national title.

After Juniors, Epping played third for Nick Rizzo until switching positions with Rizzo in 2006, and thus skipping the team. However, in 2007 he was picked up to play third for Olympic silver medallist Mike Harris. He'd only play one season for Harris before joining Wayne Middaugh's rink at second in 2008. With the Middaugh rink Epping won the 2008 National, his first Grand Slam victory. The team also played in the 2009 Canadian Olympic Curling Trials, where they finished with a 2-5 record. In 2010, Epping parted from Middaugh to form his own team.

Epping and teammates Scott Bailey, Scott Howard and David Mathers won the 2012 Players' Championship, Epping's second Grand Slam title of his career, and his first as skip. This win helped him accrue enough CTRS points to qualify for a direct spot at the 2013 Canadian Olympic Curling Trials. At the Trials, his rink (which replaced Howard with Collin Mitchell) won just one game, and finished last. Following the season, Epping formed a new team with Travis Fanset, Pat Janssen and Tim March. Mat Camm replaced Fanset in 2015.

Early on in the 2014–15 curling season, the Epping rink won the Gord Carroll Curling Classic Tour event. In that season's slams, the team made it to the semifinals of the 2014 Masters, but missed the playoffs at The National, the Canadian Open and the 2015 Elite 10. At the 2015 Ontario Tankard, Epping's team recorded an 8-2 record through the round robin, but lost to Mark Kean in the final. Fanset was replaced by Mat Camm on the team before the 2015 Players' Championship at the end of the season, where they lost in the semi-final.

At the 2016 Ontario Tankard, Epping and his rink again finished the round robin with an 8-2 record, but lost again in the final, this time to Glenn Howard.

Epping played in the 2017 Canadian Olympic Curling Trials, but again had a disappointing tournament, finishing with just a 2-6 record. He also competed in the 2018 Canadian Mixed Doubles Curling Olympic Trials with Sherry Middaugh, who replaced his usual mixed doubles partner Lisa Weagle, who had qualified in the team event with Rachel Homan. Epping and Middaugh finished the round robin with a 3-5 record and did not make it to the round of 8. Later in the season Epping would win his first ever provincial championship, finally defeating Glenn Howard in the final of the 2018 Ontario Tankard. Thus, the 2018 Tim Hortons Brier would be Epping's first Brier appearance. There, he led Team Ontario to a 9-2 record after pool play, good enough for second place going into the playoffs. However, they would lose both of their playoff games, settling for third place overall. After the season, the Epping team replaced its front-end with veteran curlers Brent Laing and Craig Savill.

Team Epping won the 2018 Masters, his fourth grand slam title, completing a career Grand Slam for Epping by winning all four "majors". Thanks to their success during the 2018-19 season, they qualified for the 2019 Tim Hortons Brier Wild Card game, despite losing in the final of the 2019 Ontario Tankard. In the Wild Card game, they lost to the Brendan Bottcher rink 8-4, missing out on playing in the Brier.

Ryan Fry joined the Epping team at third for the 2019–20 season, with Camm and Laing moving to second and lead and Savill leaving the team. They had a strong start to the year, winning both the Stu Sells Oakville Tankard and the 2019 AMJ Campbell Shorty Jenkins Classic. They had a semifinal finish at the Masters, the first Grand Slam of the season. They missed the playoffs at the next two slams, the Tour Challenge and the National after going 1–3 at both. Team Epping posted a 6–2 record en route to winning the 2019 Canada Cup in Leduc, Alberta. This win qualified them to represent Team Canada along with five other Canadian teams at the 2020 Continental Cup where they lost 22.5–37.5 to the Europeans. They had a strong showing at the Canadian Open where they made it all the way to the final where they lost to the Brad Jacobs rink. At the 2020 Ontario Tankard, they completed their undefeated run throughout the week with an 8–3 win over Glenn Howard. Representing Ontario at the 2020 Tim Hortons Brier, they finished the championship pool with a 7–4 record and in a four way tie for fourth place. They defeated Team Wild Card (Mike McEwen) in the first tiebreaker before losing to Northern Ontario (Brad Jacobs) in the second and being eliminated from contention. It would be the team's last event of the season as both the Players' Championship and the Champions Cup Grand Slam events were cancelled due to the COVID-19 pandemic.

Team Epping began the 2020–21 season with a win at the 2020 Stu Sells Toronto Tankard. The 2021 Ontario provincial playdowns were cancelled due to the COVID-19 pandemic in Ontario. As the 2020 provincial champions, Epping's team was chosen to represent Ontario at the 2021 Tim Hortons Brier in Calgary. At the Brier, Epping led his team to a 7–5 seventh place finish.

The following season, Team Epping played in the 2021 Canadian Olympic Curling Trials, where he missed the playoffs with a 3–5 record. The team re-bounded a month later by winning the ATB Banff Classic. The team played in the 2022 Ontario Tankard, but lost in the final to Team Howard, skipped by Scott Howard.  At the 2023 Tankard, Epping's rink reached the semifinal, falling to eventual winners Team Mike McEwen.

Personal life
Epping's mother is an avid curler, and his grandfather founded the Ennismore Curling Club just outside Epping's hometown of Peterborough. He is a graduate of Trent University. Epping is employed as a curling consultant with "Epping Consulting". Epping is openly gay, having coming out to his parents in the Fall of 2011, before telling his then-team in 2012, and coming out publicly in 2017. He married Thomas Shipton in 2017.

Grand Slam record

References

External links

1983 births
Living people
Sportspeople from Peterborough, Ontario
Canadian consultants
Curlers from Toronto
Canadian male curlers
Canadian mixed curling champions
Canadian LGBT sportspeople
Gay sportsmen
Canadian curling coaches
LGBT curlers
Continental Cup of Curling participants
Canada Cup (curling) participants
21st-century Canadian people
21st-century Canadian LGBT people
Canadian gay men